Kabushi is a constituency of the National Assembly of Zambia. It covers the Kabushi, Luboto and Masala areas of Ndola in Ndola District of Copperbelt Province.

List of MPs

References

Constituencies of the National Assembly of Zambia
Constituencies established in 1973
1973 establishments in Zambia
Ndola